Jay Ryan (born Jay Bunyan; 29 August 1981) is a New Zealand actor. He is best known for his roles as Jack Scully in the Australian soap opera Neighbours, Kevin in the New Zealand comedy-drama programme Go Girls, Mark Mitcham in the internationally produced New Zealand television programme Top of the Lake, Vincent Keller in the American television series Beauty & the Beast and Detective Ben Wesley in the Canadian television series Mary Kills People.

Ryan made his feature film breakthrough playing adult Ben Hanscom in It Chapter Two, a sequel to the 2017 horror film It, based on the 1986 novel of the same name.

Career
Under the name Jay Bunyan, he appeared as "Glen" in the "Scallywag Pirates" (2000) and had a minor role in Xena: Warrior Princess. He is known for his portrayal of Jack Scully in the Australian soap opera Neighbours from late 2002 until January 2005.

From 2007 to 2009, Ryan played Seaman William "Billy" Webb aka Spider in the popular Australian drama, Sea Patrol.

From a theatre background Ryan has shared the stage with the likes of John Cleese and toured internationally with The Packer, an acclaimed solo show written by NZ/Niuean playwright Dianna Fuemana.

From 2009 to 2012, Ryan played Kevin in the New Zealand comedy/drama series Go Girls. In 2011, he joined the cast of the Australian comedy/drama series Offspring.  Also in 2011, Ryan guest starred on the American science fiction series Terra Nova, playing a murderer.  For this role, Ryan used an American accent.

In 2012, Ryan was cast as the male lead in the CW's Beauty & the Beast pilot. The CW officially announced the series at the May 2012 Up Fronts in New York.

Ryan starred as the adult Ben Hanscom in the 2019 horror film It Chapter Two, the sequel to It (2017). He shares the character with Jeremy Ray Taylor.

Personal life
Ryan has a daughter named Eve (born 2013) with his wife Dianna Fuemana.

Filmography

Film

Television

Awards

References

External links

 Jay Ryan page – Official Go Girls Website

Living people
New Zealand male film actors
New Zealand male soap opera actors
New Zealand male television actors
People from Auckland
1981 births
20th-century New Zealand male actors
21st-century New Zealand male actors